The Bentley Hotel is a hotel in Manhattan's Upper East Side, in the U.S. state of New York.

Description
The 21-story hotel, converted from an office building in 1998, has 197 rooms, as of 2010. Many rooms offer views of the East River and Queensboro Bridge. New York magazine's Nick Divito described the hotel as "a former high-rise office building that's been converted into a beacon of contemporary and surprisingly comfortable style. Think bright lights, boxy leather sofas and brushed-steel side tables."

History
Joey Allaham opened the rooftop kosher restaurant Prime at the Bentley in 2012.

On May 8, 2020, the hotel's doors were opened to the city's local homeless population in order to curb the spread of COVID-19 and ease overcrowding at homeless shelters during the 2019–20 coronavirus pandemic.

Reception
Bentley ranks number 209 on U.S News & World Report list of "Best New York City Hotels".

References

External links

 

Hotels in Manhattan
Upper East Side